This table lists Zimbabwe presidential election results by province.

Legend

Chronological table of results

See also 
 Elections in Zimbabwe

References 

presidential election results by province
results by province
presidential election results